Scouts in Scouting Ireland are aged between 11 and a half to 16 years of age. Each group has a Court of Honour/Patrol Leader's Council which under the guidance of an adult Scouter designs and implements activities. Scouts is the section where activities begin to really challenge the youth member and impart responsibility and self-reliance in accordance with the Scout method and the educational philosophy of Baden-Powell. The organisation also currently has Sea Scout and Air Scout programmes. The highest award is the Chief Scout Award.

Crean Awards
As part of ONE programme, the award scheme in the Scout section mirrors that in other sections, with its specific symbolic framework. Polar explorer Tom Crean is the inspiration for the Crean Awards badge scheme. There are 4 badges, named after Crean's expeditions (Discovery, Terra Nova, Endurance and Polar), with each needing about a year to complete.

The first badge Discovey, doubles as a requirement for investiture into the section.

The Chief Scout Award is also available to obtain for Scouts in their final year in the section. Adventure skills and Special Interest badges are a requirement of this award.

Troop Structure
Scouts are divided up in patrols and troops.

6-8 Scouts make up a patrol. The patrol is the main unit of the Scout programme and most activities are done in the patrol. The patrol is led by an older Scout known as a patrol leader (pl). He is helped by an assistant patrol leader. All other members of the patrol are given jobs (e.g. cook, first aider, scribe). The patrol system encourages teamwork and youth leadership.

A standard troop is made up of 20-32 Scouts (divided into 3-4 patrols) under the leadership of a group of Adult Scouters. The PLs come together in Court of Honour/Patrol Leaders Council to help the Scouters run the troop.

The highlight of the Scouting year is the troop annual camp which usually takes place at summer time

The Phoenix Patrol Challenge

The Phoenix Patrol Challenge is the national Scoutcraft competition. It is organised by the National Events Team. Patrols of 8 members qualify from their respective Scout Counties to reach the 4 day event. Patrols combine traditional Scout skills with team games. Tasks vary from year to year, with pioneering, water activities, hiking, bivouacking and crafts. There are separate prizes for Campcraft, Cooking, Health & Safety, activity bases and special projects and the coveted overall winners' prize.

The Phoenix evolved from the Melvin competition of Scouting Ireland (CSI) and the Smythe Cup of Scouting Ireland S.A.I. The name "Phoenix" was chosen for its symbolic meaning by the National Patrol Leaders' Forum in August 2004. The first official Phoenix Challenge was run in 2005 in Pallaskenry (County Limerick). Although, the National Patrol Challenge was held in Larch Hill in August 2004. In 2006 it was held in Tollymore Forest Park (County Down). Each Phoenix is themed and all of the activities relate to the theme, Pallaskenry 2005 had the theme "Journey Through Science"; Tollymore 2006 was "The Medieval Experience"; The Curragh 2007 was themed "The Flight of the Phoenix"; Larch Hill 2008 was themed "1908: In The Beginning"; Mount Melleray 2009 was themed "SURVIVOR: Fun, Friendship & Challenge"; Larch Hill 2010 was themed "The Big Bang"; Pallaskenry 2011 was themed "The Era of Adventurers"; Larch Hill 2012 was themed "The Olympics"; Castlesaunderson 2013 was themed "Peace";

Winners
 2004 - Larch Hill - 34th Limerick (Pallaskenry)
 2005 - Pallaskenry - 17th/20th Waterford (St. Pauls)
 2006 - Tollymore - 34th Limerick  (Pallaskenry)
 2007 - Curragh - 17th/20th Waterford (St. Pauls)
 2008 - Larch Hill & Lough Dan - Gold Recipients: 91st Dublin (Bluebell), 11th Belfast (St. Colmcille's), 7th Waterford (De La Salle), 18th/19th Cork (Fermoy), 17th/20th Waterford (St. Pauls), 3rd Cork (St Patrick's),
 2009 - Mount Melleray & Glenshellane - 7th Waterford (De La Salle)
 2010 - Larch Hill & Lough Dan  - 17th/20th Waterford (St. Pauls)
 2011 - Pallaskenry & Curragh Chase  - 17th/20th Waterford (St. Pauls)
 2012 - Larch Hill - 17th/20th Waterford (St. Pauls)
 2013 - Castle Saunderson- 7th Waterford (De La Salle)
 2014 - Mount Melleray & Waterford City - 18/26th Waterford (Ferrybank)
 2015 - Pallaskenry - 4th Louth St. Olivers Group 3/4/6 Louth, Drogheda (The Snow Patrol)
 2016 - Mount Melleary  - 80th Cork (Little island)
 2017 - Stormont - 18/26th Waterford (Ferrybank)
 2018 - Pallaskenry - 2nd Cork (Ballyphehane)
 2019 - Cork Showgrounds - 4th Louth St. Olivers Group 3/4/6 Louth, Drogheda (The Snow Patrol)

There was no competition in 2020 and 2021 due to the COVID-19 pandemic.
 2022 - Pallaskenry - 13th Wexford (Clonard)

Mountaineering Events
Scouting Ireland has 3 mountaineering events- the Mountain Pursuit Challenge, Sionnach Adventure and PEAK.

The Mountain Pursuit Challenges (MPCs) are a series of weekend events for teams of 4 Scouts aged 13–16 with a leader. There are four events — Munster (April), leinster (May), Connaught (September) and Ulster (October). There is also the locally organised County Expedition and County Pursuit Challenge which are aimed towards younger Scouts.

The Sionnach Adventures were originally run by SAI. There are 3 events run each year.

Patrol Expedition Adventure Kamp (PEAK) is a week-long training adventure for Scouts aged 14–16 run over Easter week in Caponalea Outdoor Education Centre is Kerry. Scouts learn hiking and teamwork skills.

Air Scouting Events
"Air" is one of the nine adventure skills under the One Programme, and the main national event is the "Iolar Challenge" which takes place in Ballyboughal Airfield in late August each year. The weekend provides an opportunity for Scouts and ventures to camp on an active airfield for the weekend and participate in aviation themed programme provided by a mix of Scouters and external industry experts.

National Scout Forum
The National Scout Forum represents Scouts on all national administrative bodies in line with the organisation's Youth Charter. The nine member committee is elected annually at the National Youth Forum and meets regularly to discuss matters of importance to Scouts nationwide. See also National Venture Forum and National Rover Forum. One of the primary roles of the nine member team is to present the successful motions of the National Scout Forum to the company's General Meetings.

References

Scouting Ireland